James L. Benepe III (born October 24, 1963) is an American professional golfer who has played on the PGA Tour and the Nationwide Tour.

Biography
Benepe was born, raised and lived most of his life in Sheridan, Wyoming. He attended Northwestern University and was a first-team All-American in 1986 as well as the 1986 Big Ten Champion while a member of the golf team. He turned pro in 1986.

Benepe played his first full-year as a professional golfer, 1987, in Asia, on the Australian Tour and on the Canadian Tour. That year, he won the British Columbia Open in Canada; and was the winner of the Canadian Tour's Order of Merit and Rookie of the Year awards. In February 1988, he won Victorian Open in Melbourne, Australia. He joined the PGA Tour in 1988.

Benepe won the 1988 Beatrice Western Open, the first PGA Tour event he ever played in. The tournament was held at Butler National GC in Oak Brook, Illinois that year, and he only got in through a last-minute sponsor exemption. Benepe used a local caddie, James Tunney, to help him to his victory.  Peter Jacobsen double bogeyed the 72nd hole, which gave Benepe the victory. It turned out to be his only career win in an official PGA Tour event. He won the PGA Tour's 1988 Rookie of the Year honors. He is still the only person to win a PGA Tour event on his first attempt and the only Wyoming-born PGA Tour winner.

Benepe left the PGA Tour at the end of the 1991 season after struggling the previous several years with back problems and technical problems with his game. After leaving the Tour, he came home to Sheridan and began working in real estate sales and promotions. After a long hiatus, he began playing competitive tour golf again in the late 1990s in Australia, on the PGA Tour and in about 15 events per year on the Nationwide Tour.  Benepe finished 26th on the Nationwide Tour in 2001 with 6 top-10 finishes and 16th on the Australian Order of Merit.

Benepe was inducted into the Wyoming Sports & Wyoming State Golf Association Hall of Fames in 2006 and the Northwestern Sports Hall of Fame in 2008.

Today he works in the corporate world consulting in various aviation arenas and lives in Sheridan, Wyoming with his wife.

Amateur wins (3)
1982 Wyoming Stroke Play Championship, Western Junior
1983 Wyoming State Match Play Championship

Professional wins (3)

PGA Tour wins (1)

PGA Tour of Australasia wins (1)

Canadian Tour wins (1)
1987 British Columbia Open

Results in major championships

CUT = missed the half-way cut
"T" = tied

See also
1990 PGA Tour Qualifying School graduates

References

External links 

American male golfers
PGA Tour golfers
Northwestern Wildcats men's golfers
Golfers from Wyoming
People from Sheridan, Wyoming
1963 births
Living people